Marjorie Agosín (born June 15, 1955) is a Chilean-American writer. She has gained notability for her outspokenness for women's rights in Chile. The United Nations has honored her for her work on human rights. The Chilean government awarded her with the Gabriela Mistral Medal of Honor for Life Achievement in 2000. She is a recipient of the Belpré Medal. In the United States, she has received the Letras de Oro, the Latino Literary Prize, and the Peabody Award, together with the United Nations Leadership Award in Human Rights.

Life 
Agosín was born in 1955 to Moises and Frida Agosín in Bethesda, Maryland, before quickly moving to Chile, where she lived with her Jewish family in a German community. While she was raised to appreciate her Jewish heritage, her family also appreciated the dominant Catholic culture of Chile. Her aunt even organized Easter Egg hunts for her and her mother adored the beauty of the Catholic churches in Chile. Agosín attended the Hebrew School in Santiago, Chile. After the coup d'état of September 11, 1973, she left with her family to live in the United States.

Career 
Agosín studied in Georgia, and later attended Indiana University Bloomington, where she obtained her PhD in Latin American Literature.  After receiving her degree, her first job was as an assistant professor at Wellesley College, the same Massachusetts women's college at which, at the age of thirty-seven, she became one of the youngest women ever to obtain the rank of full professor in the history of the institution, and at which, after more than twenty years, she continues to teach.

She edited the anthology These Are Not Sweet Girls: Poetry by Latin American Women (White Pine Press, 1991), featuring newly translated poems by Gabriela Mistral, Rosario Castellanos, Giannina Braschi, Olga Nolla, Julia de Burgos, Violeta Parra, Cristina Peri Rossi, and other Latina poets.

Agosín began to write poetry in Spanish when she was ten years old, and although she speaks both English and Yiddish, she has written her extensive work in Spanish.

Agosín is a prolific author: her published books, including those she has written as well as those she has edited, number over eighty. She has published several books of fiction, among them two collections of short stories: La Felicidad (1991) and Las Alfarenas (1994).   Agosín's series of memoirs began with a book about her mother's life in the south of Chile, A Cross and a Star: Memoirs of a Jewish Girl in Chile (1995).  The later two volumes related the story of her father's life, Always from Somewhere Else (1998), and Agosín's own story, The Alphabet in My Hands (2000).  In each of these books, the prevailing theme is that of the Jewish immigrant who is trying to find a place in Latin American society.  She contributed the piece "Women of smoke" to the 1984 anthology Sisterhood Is Global: The International Women's Movement Anthology, edited by Robin Morgan.  Her two most recent books are both poetry collections, The Light of Desire / La Luz del Deseo, translated by Lori Marie Carlson (Swan Isle Press, 2009), and Secrets in the Sand: The Young Women of Juárez, translated by Celeste Kostopulos-Cooperman (White Pine Press, 2006), about the female homicides in Ciudad Juárez. She teaches Spanish language and Latin American literature at Wellesley College.

Selected published works
 Conchali, (Senda Nueva de Ediciones, 1980), 
 Brujas Y Algo Más: Witches and Other Things, (Latin American Literary Review Press, 1984), 
 Violeta Parra: santa de pura greda : un estudio de su obra poética, (with Inés Dölz-Blackburn), (Planeta, 1988), 
 La Felicidad (Editorial Cuarto Propio, 1991) 
 Sargazo (White Pine Press, 1993) 
 La Alfareras (Editorial Cuarto Propio, 1994) 
 Tapestries of hope, threads of love, (University of New Mexico Press, 1996) 
 A Woman's Gaze: Latin American Women Artists (White Pine Press, 1998) 
 The Alphabet in My Hands: A Writing Life, translated by Nancy Abraham Hall (Rutgers University Press, 2000)
 Always from Somewhere Else: A Memoir of My Chilean Jewish Father, (Editor), (Feminist Press, 2000), 
 Women, gender, and human rights: a global perspective, (Rutgers University Press, 2001), 
 Secrets in the Sand: The Young Women of Juárez (White Pine Press, 2006), 
 The Light of Desire / La Luz del Deseo, translated by Lori Marie Carlson (Swan Isle Press, 2010), 
 I Lived on Butterfly Hill, (Atheneum Books for Young Readers, an imprint of Simon & Schuster, 2014)

References

External links
 Poems: The International Literary Quarterly > Issue 3, May 2008 > Poems by Marjorie Agosín translated by Roberta Gordenstein
 Poem: poets.org > Secrets in the Sand (and the night was a precipice) by Marjorie Agosín
 Review: Barnes and Noble Online > Secrets in the Sand: The Young Women of Juárez by Marjorie Agosín > Review by Library Journal
 Vivancos Pérez, Ricardo F. "Marjorie Agosín's Poetics of Memory: Human Rights, Feminism, and Literary Forms." Confronting Global Gender Justice: Women's Lives, Human Rights. Ed. Debra Bergoffen, Paula Ruth Gilbert, Tamara Harvey, and Connie L. McNeely. Oxford, UK: Routledge, 2010. 112–25.

1955 births
Living people
American humanities academics
American women essayists
20th-century American novelists
American women novelists
American women poets
Chilean emigrants to the United States
Chilean Jews
Naturalized citizens of Chile
Indiana University Bloomington alumni
Wellesley College faculty
21st-century American novelists
20th-century American women writers
21st-century American women writers
20th-century American poets
21st-century American poets
Chilean women writers
20th-century American essayists
21st-century American essayists
Novelists from Massachusetts
American women academics